The Fever was an American indie rock band from New York City.

History
The Fever formed in 2001 around songwriting partners Geremy Jasper (vocals) and Chris Sanchez (guitar). After expanding to a five-piece, the group signed with Kemado Records, releasing their debut EP, Pink on Pink, in 2002. The full-length, Red Bedroom followed in 2003, as did touring with bands such as Hot Hot Heat, Death From Above 1979, Moving Units, VHS or Beta, Metric, and the Kills. After the departure of guitarist Sanchez, the band regrouped the remaining original members as a four-piece with Keith Stapleton switching from bass to guitar, followed by the 2006 release, In the City of Sleep, but disbanded soon after in the fall of that year.

Members
Geremy Jasper: vocals
Chris Ruggiero (Sanchez Esquire): guitar (2001–2004)
Keith Stapleton (Pony): bass (2001–2004) & guitar (2004–2006)
Achilles Tzoulafis: drums
J. Ruggiero: organ

Discography
Pink on Pink EP (Kemado, 2002)
Ladyfingers/ Glamorous Life Remix 12" Vinyl (Kemado, 2003)
Red Bedroom (Kemado, 2004)
Bridge & Tunnel/ The Slow Club 7" Vinyl UK only (Kemado, 2005)
Red Room: Jasper vs. Sanchez Remixes 12" Vinyl (Kemado, 2005)
Minotour EP Tour EP (Kemado 2006)
In the City of Sleep (Kemado, 2006)

Videography
2004: Gray Ghost [Directed by Hunter Gatherer]
2005: Ladyfingers [Directed by Josh & Xander]
2006: Waiting for the Centipede [Directed by Geremy Jasper & Johanna Witherby]

Appearance in the Media
 The song "Ladyfingers" is in the movies Shortbus
 The Fever were the musical guest on Last Call with Carson Daly on September 10, 2004. They performed "Ladyfingers" & "Gray Ghost"
The song "Eyes on the Road" appears on the soundtrack of Rockstar Games Midnight Club: Los Angeles.

References

Indie rock musical groups from New York (state)
Musical groups from New York City
Musical groups established in 2001
Musical groups disestablished in 2006
2001 establishments in New York City
2006 disestablishments in New York (state)